Turbaco is a municipality in the Bolívar Department of Colombia.  It is located about 20 km southeast of Cartagena de Indias and is one of Bolívar's most organized municipalities. Turbaco is known for its famous "Fiesta de Toros" (Bulls's feast) in December to celebrate the new year.  Currently, the municipality is undergoing major expansion plans and remodeling.

Juan de la Cosa was mortally wounded here in 1510, before Pedro de Heredia subjugated the area in 1533.

Antonio López de Santa Anna spent some of his exile years here, 1850–1853 and 1855–1857.

References

Municipalities of Bolívar Department